Kung Fu Rider (Japanese: 街スベリ, Chinese: 功夫滑仔), previously known as Slider, is an action video game for the PlayStation 3. The game is developed by Japan Studio and published by Sony Computer Entertainment for use with the PlayStation Move controller. It was officially unveiled at the 2010 Game Developers Conference in San Francisco. It was released in Australia on September 16, 2010, in Europe and North America on September 17, and Japan on October 21, and received mostly negative reviews from critics.

Plot
Players take the role of private investigator Toby or his secretary Karin as the two escape from the Triads in Hong Kong.

Gameplay

Players have to utilize the Move controller to navigate through the crowded streets of Hong Kong on a sliding office chair. Players can move the controller up and down to increase speed while tilting it left and right would turn the chair while tapping the Move button would cause the character to spin and kick items out of the way. Players can cruise through the streets hopping over cars, juke left, right and pick up money along the way which act as points in the game and sliding through onscreen ticket outlines which will boost the game's meter which can trigger a burst of speed by jabbing at the PlayStation Eye.

The game features realistic physics similar to the PlayStation Network game, Pain, where the player character will be sent off the chair in slow motion upon crashing or being hit by an enemy. As players proceed deeper into the game, Triad enemies begin appearing on the way and attempt to attack the player using Bō staffs.

Reception
Kung Fu Rider received "generally unfavorable" reviews according to the review aggregator website Metacritic.

References

2010 video games
Fighting games
PlayStation 3 games
PlayStation 3-only games
PlayStation Move-compatible games
PlayStation Move-only games
Sony Interactive Entertainment games
Video games developed in Japan
Video games set in Hong Kong